Most prime ministers of the United Kingdom have enjoyed the right to display coats of arms and to this day, prime ministers can have their ancestral arms approved, or new armorial bearings granted, either by the College of Arms or the Lyon Court.

Prime ministers of Great Britain in the 18th century

Prime ministers of the United Kingdom in the 19th century

Prime ministers of the United Kingdom in the 20th century

Prime ministers of the United Kingdom in the 21st century

References

Further reading
 Burke's Peerage & Baronetage
 Debrett's People of Today

External links
 College of Arms

Coats of arms of Prime Ministers
British heraldry
Prime Ministers
Armorial
 
Prime minister of the United Kingdom